The North Keltma ( - Severnaya Keltma) is a river in Komi Republic, Russia, a left tributary of the Vychegda. It starts in the extreme south of the Komi Republic, near the border with Perm Krai. It flows into the Vychegda near the settlement of Kerchomya. There are many swamps along the river.

The river freezes in the early November and stays under the ice until early May.
It is connected with the South Keltma by the Northern Catherine Canal, which was constructed in 1785–1822 but operated for only 16 years.

Main tributaries:
Left: Okos, Voch, Vol;
Right: Yol, Michayol

References 

Rivers of the Komi Republic